Frank Sinatra Sings the Select Sammy Cahn is a 1996 compilation album by Frank Sinatra that has him singing the songs written by Sammy Cahn.

Track listing
 All songs written by Sammy Cahn.

 "Come Fly with Me" (Sammy Cahn, Jimmy Van Heusen) - 3:19
 "Time After Time" (Cahn, Jule Styne) - 3:31
 "(Love Is) The Tender Trap" (Cahn, Van Heusen) - 3:00
 "Guess I'll Hang My Tears Out to Dry" (Cahn, Styne) - 4:00
 "Love and Marriage" (Cahn, Van Heusen) - 2:36
 "Saturday Night (Is the Loneliest Night of the Week)" (Cahn, Styne) - 1:54
 "All the Way" (Cahn, Van Heusen) - 2:53
 "I've Heard That Song Before" (Cahn, Styne) - 2:33
 "All My Tomorrows" (Cahn, Van Heusen) - 3:15
 "It's the Same Old Dream" (Cahn, Styne) - 3:06
 "Come Dance With Me" (Cahn, Van Heusen) - 2:31
 "Three Coins in the Fountain" (Cahn, Styne) - 3:07
 "Day by Day" (Cahn, Styne) - 2:39
 "To Love and Be Loved" (Cahn, Van Heusen) - 2:56
 "High Hopes" (Cahn, Van Heusen) - 2:42
 "If It's the Last Thing I'll Do" (Cahn, Styne) - 4:00
 "Five Minutes More" (Cahn, Styne) - 2:35
 "The Last Dance" (Cahn, Van Heusen) - 2:09

1996 compilation albums
Frank Sinatra compilation albums